A constitutional referendum was held in Algeria on 5 May 1946 as part of a wider French constitutional referendum. The proposed new constitution was rejected by 51.5% of voters, with a turnout of 71%.

Results

References

1946 referendums
1946 1
1946 1
1946 in Algeria
Constitutional referendums in France